Leonard Alvyn Watters (June 4, 1898 – December 1986) was an American football player and coach.

Watters was born in Dubuque, Iowa and attended Central High School in South Bend, Indiana, and Springfield College in Springfield, Massachusetts.  He played professional football for the Buffalo Bisons in the 1924 NFL season, appearing in eight games for the Bisons.  Watters spent 42 years as a coach, including 15 years as the head football coach for Williams College from 1948 to 1962. He compiled a record of 68–47 at Williams and ranks fourth in career wins among Williams Ephs football coaches.

References

1898 births
1986 deaths
American football ends
Buffalo Bisons (NFL) players
Bunker Hill Naval Air Station Blockbusters football coaches
Springfield Pride football players
Williams Ephs football coaches
High school football coaches in New York (state)
Sportspeople from Dubuque, Iowa
Players of American football from South Bend, Indiana